His Darker Self is a 1924 American silent blackface comedy film directed by John W. Noble and starring Lloyd Hamilton, Tom Wilson, and Sally Long. The plot involves a self-taught small town detective who, after a Black friend is killed, goes undercover in blackface.

Plot
As described in a film magazine review, Uncle Eph, the old black servant of the Sappington family, hauls liquor at night to Bill Jackson's dancehall. Jackson in a fit of temper knocks out Eph and fatally stabs another man. Eph is blamed for the crime. Claude Sappington, in love with the Governor's daughter, but frowned upon by her father, blackens his face and visits Darktown in an attempt to discover the real murderer. After many wild adventures, he succeeds in making Jackson confess, saves old Eph, and marries the woman he loves.

Cast

Production
Al Jolson was originally cast as the lead in His Darker Self, but he dropped out to protect his stage career. Lloyd Hamilton, a veteran of many comedy short films, replaced Jolson. Jolson would later use blackface while starring in the first talking picture, The Jazz Singer (1927).

References

Bibliography
 Munden, Kenneth White (1997). The American Film Institute Catalog of Motion Pictures Produced in the United States, Part 1. University of California Press.

External links

1924 films
1924 comedy films
1920s English-language films
American silent feature films
Silent American comedy films
American black-and-white films
Films directed by John W. Noble
Films distributed by W. W. Hodkinson Corporation
1920s American films